Marsus is a Roman family name, and the Latinisation of the surnames Marso and Marsi.

Marsus may refer to:

People
 Domitius Marsus, Latin poet of ancient Rome; friend of Virgil and Tibullus
 Gaius Vibius Marsus, proconsul of the Roman Empire during the first century
 Marsus (king), Latin name of mythical Germanic king Mers, aka Marso
 Paulus Marsus (1440–1484), Renaissance humanist and poet known primarily for his commentary on the Fasti of Ovid
 Petrus Marsus (1442–1512), aka Peter Marso, Renaissance scholar who wrote a commentary on Silius Italicus' epic poem Punica

Other uses
 Marsus municipium, the Latin alias of San Benedetto dei Marsi, a comune and town in the province of L'Aquila in the Abruzzo region of Italy
 Spectamen marsus, a Pacific sea snail species with a streaked top shell

See also
 Marsi (disambiguation)